Mulitefala is an islet of Funafuti, Tuvalu.

References

Islands of Tuvalu
Pacific islands claimed under the Guano Islands Act
Funafuti